Diligent (or Petit Diligent), was the Bengal Pilot Service schooner Tannah (or Tanna), that the Bombay Dockyard had launched in 1775 for the Bengal Pilot Service of the British East India Company (EIC). The French Navy captured her in 1781. She then became a 10-gun corvette of the French Navy, but sank in 1782.

Career
Although Tannah is described as a pilot schooner, that may reflect her role rather than her sailing rig. She was one of a number of pilot vessels that the Bengal Pilot Service operated to help East Indiamen and other vessels approaching the mouth of the Hooghly River.

On 24 January 1781, off Pulicat,  captured Tannah (or Tanna), as Tanna was coming into Madras with two small prizes.

Within the year, the French brought Tannah to Île de France (Mauritius), converted her to a corvette, and recommissioned her under the name Diligent.

Diligent, Captain Macé, was present on 6 July 1782 at the Battle of Negapatam.

Fate
In August 1782, Diligent sank off Cuddalore.

Citations and references 
Citations

References
 
 
 
 Wadia, R. A., (1957; 1986) The Bombay Dockyard and the Wadia Master Builders. (Bombay)

1775 ships
Ships of the British East India Company
Captured ships
Corvettes of the French Navy